Partutovice is a municipality and village in Přerov District in the Olomouc Region of the Czech Republic. It has about 500 inhabitants.

History

The first written mention of Partutovice is from 1412.

Sights
The landmark of Partutovice is a wooden windmill built in 1837.

References

Villages in Přerov District